Morgan Stanislaus "Stan" Grace  (28 February 1837 – 19 April 1903) was a surgeon in Wellington, member of the Legislative Council of New Zealand, and a staunch Roman Catholic.

Early life
He was born on 28 February 1837 in Clonmel, County Tipperary, Ireland, to Ellen Mary Russell and her husband, James Grace, a landowner.

Grace grew up on a farm belonging to his father. His maternal family were Scottish Calvinists, but he was brought up and educated a Catholic. His formal education began at the Jesuit-run Stonyhurst College, England. He apparently started his university studies in Dublin and spent some time on the Continent; this may have included a period in Paris. In 1858 he received a diploma in medicine at the University of Jena, Germany, and in 1859 he took his licentiate at the Royal College of Surgeons of Edinburgh.

Military career
He enlisted in the British Army on 20 April 1859 as staff assistant and surgeon. He arrived in Auckland with a detachment of troops on the Nugget on 21 June 1860, three months after the start of the Waitara war in the Taranaki Region. He served as a medical officer in the First Taranaki War, the Invasion of Waikato and in subsequent campaigns. He left the Imperial Army, joining the Colonial Forces, and became their Surgeon-General.

Medical career
In 1866 Grace started a very successful medical practice in Wellington, which he was to keep up for over 30 years. He was Honorary Surgeon at the Wellington Hospital from 1879–1882 and Honorary Consulting Surgeon at Wellington Hospital between 1883–1886.

Politics
In 1870 he received a letter from Sir William Fox, Premier of New Zealand, inviting him to the Legislative Council, the upper house of the New Zealand Parliament. He served on the Council until his death. In 1890 he moved the address in reply, and in a long speech looked back over his 30 years in the colony.

Business
Grace was a founding director of the New Zealand board of the Australian Mutual Provident Society from 17 February 1871 and was chairman from 1891 to 1893. He was president of the New Zealand Medical Association in 1892. His many business activities included ownership of the Wellington City Tramways Company for some years. He sold the company to the Wellington City Council in 1900.

Author
In 1899 Grace published a short book, A sketch of the New Zealand war.

Family
On 25 January 1866 he married Agnes Mary Johnston, the daughter of John Johnston, a wealthy merchant and a member of the Legislative Council. The couple were to have nine surviving children: five boys and four girls.

His elder brother William Russell Grace was also the first Catholic Mayor of New York.

His nephew Cecil Grace attempted a crossing of the English Channel in December 1910 in an aeroplane. He flew from Dover to Calais. However, in coming back he became disoriented and over Dover flew northeast over the Goodwin Sands toward the North Sea and was lost.

References

1837 births
1903 deaths
New Zealand Companions of the Order of St Michael and St George
Members of the New Zealand Legislative Council
Irish emigrants to New Zealand (before 1923)
University of Jena alumni
New Zealand Roman Catholics
People from Clonmel
New Zealand Medical Association
People educated at Stonyhurst College
Burials at Karori Cemetery
19th-century New Zealand politicians
Johnston family